The Cais do Sodré Railway Station is an intermodal railway station in the civil parish of Misericórdia, in the municipality of Lisbon, serving as the terminus of the suburban route to the resort town Cascais.

History

In 1925, the company Sociedade Estoril elaborated a project for a station along the margin of the civil parish of São Paulo.

The station was completed and inaugurated on 18 August 1928.

A new roof was built over the platforms in 1960, but on 28 May 1963 this collapsed while one train was loading and another was unloading.  About 50 people were killed and many more injured.

In 1993, metro station Cais do Sodré metro station was opened to link the railway station, a project of Nuno Teotónio Pereira, who was contracted in 1998 to remodel the site. He was brought back in 2000, in order to construct the river terminal along the northern margin of the Tagus.

On 4 August 1995, there was a proposal to classify the railway station by URBE. A dispatch to begin the classification process was instituted on 20 OCtober 2004, by the vice-president of IPPAR, which was later amended on 24 August 2007 (to status of Imóvel de Interesse Público), and later, on 23 November 2011, Conselho Nacional de Cultura (National Council of Culture) proposed its classification as a Monumento de Interesse Público (Monument of Public Interest). It was on 30 January 2012, when the project was descively classified and its area of protection designated (Announcement 1216/2012, Diário da República, Série 2, 15).

Architecture

It is an inter-modal exchange connecting the Lisbon Metro, rail-lines and river terminal centre, a complex situated at the Duque de Terceirasquare. The station is adjacent to the Lisbon Metro station (which is the terminus for the Metro's Green Line) and isolated along the northern margin of Tagus River, with ferry service to Cacilhas, Seixal and Montijo (the Transtejo & Soflusa service).

The station comprises a building with three bodies juxtapositioned in an "U" design, with the steel and tiled central hall covering the rail-lines that parallel the Tagus River and Avenida 24 de Julho. The main hall, that includes the vestibule ticket offices, is a rectangular body with terrace oriented to the northeast. Its main facade is divided into three sections with the identical lateral bodies of smaller dimensions, with the central composed of five ample bodies on the first floor, decorated by extensive rectangular flaps supported by four corbels. To the second floor, is an ample surface topped by depressed arch, decorated by small geometric elements in triangular forms. The lateral bodies, that include one per floor are demarcated and separated by a panel of rectangular mosaics. Flanking the pans, are striated bronze columns that extend down to the bas-relief of the same material that finishes the span of the second floor. To finish off the facade, there is a paltibanda with cornice in a collapsed arch.

Attached to the main building are two similar annex bodies with identical facades, consisting of two floors of simple rectangular spans decorated in intervals by geometric mosaic panels. The northern rectangular body, covered in tile, has an extensive facade that parallels the public roadway. The eastern annex is an "L"-shape building with lateral facade oriented to the south that correspond to administrative services. Juxtapositioned to the main body on either side are triangular spans with curved apex that resembles the decorative discourse of the main facades.

The Art Deco design was by Porfírio Pardal Monteiro (1897–1957) and the Metro station is decorated with works by abstract artist António Dacosta, in addition to an underground waterfall.

References

Notes

Sources
 
 
 
 
 
 
 

Railway stations in Lisbon
Railway stations opened in 1895
Art Deco architecture in Portugal
Art Deco railway stations
Misericórdia
1895 establishments in Europe